Ger Manley (born 13 January 1968) is an Irish former hurler and Gaelic footballer. At club level he played with Inniscarra, Midleton and Muskerry and was also a member of the Cork senior hurling team.

Playing career

Manley first played Gaelic football and hurling with the Inniscarra club. He won a Mid Cork JAFC title with the club in 1989, while he also lined out with the Muskerry divisional team as a dual player. Manley first appeared on the inter-county scene as a member of the Cork minor team that won the 1985 All-Ireland MHC title. He progressed onto the under-21 team and was at centre-forward on the team that beat Kilkenny in the 1988 All-Ireland under-21 final. Manley made his senior team debut againts Waterford during the 1987–88 league, however, it took a number of years before he established himself on the team. In the meantime, he won an All-Ireland JFC with the Cork junior football team in 1990. Manley won a Munster SHC in 1992, however, Cork lost the subsequent All-Ireland final to Kilkenny. He added a National League title to his collection in 1993. Manley ended his club career as a goalkeeper with Midleton.

Management career

Manley first became involved in team management and coaching at various level with Midleton. He was a selector with the Cork under-21 hurling team that was beaten by Tipperary in the 2007 All-Ireland minor final. Manley subsequently spent two years as manager of the team. He later took charge of a number of club sides, including Kilbree and Slieve Bloom.

Honours

Player

Inniscarra
Mid Cork Junior A Football Championship: 1989

Cork
Munster Senior Hurling Championship: 1992
All-Ireland Junior Football Championship: 1990
Munster Junior Football Championship: 1988, 1990, 1992
Munster Junior Hurling Championship: 1992
All-Ireland Under-21 Hurling Championship: 1988
Munster Under-21 Hurling Championship: 1988
All-Ireland Minor Hurling Championship: 1985
Munster Minor Hurling Championship: 1985, 1986

Munster
Railway Cup: 1995, 1996

Manager

Kilbree
South West Junior A Hurling Championship: 2016, 2018

Cork
Munster Minor Hurling Championship: 2008

References

1968 births
Living people
Inniscarra hurlers
Inniscarra Gaelic footballers
Midleton hurlers
Muskerry hurlers
Muskerry Gaelic footballers
Cork inter-county hurlers
Cork inter-county Gaelic footballers
Munster inter-provincial hurlers
Hurling goalkeepers
Hurling selectors
Hurling managers
Dual players